Indu Prakash was an Anglo - Marathi periodical published from Bombay in the late 1800s and early 1900s. Established by Vishnu Parshuram Pandit in 1862, it was published as a weekly bi-lingual periodical and often contained articles supporting the Indian freedom movement and criticism of the British colonial rule. It was later merged in Lokmanya . Ranade, Telang, Chandwarakar, Parvate were involved in success of Induprakash. K.G.Deshpande who was in charge of Induprakash requested Sri Aurobindo to write about the current Political situation. Aurobindo Ghosh began writing a series of fiery articles under the title "New Lamps for Old" where in he strongly criticised the Congress for its moderate policy 

The newspaper's name means Moon light in English.

References 

Newspapers published in Mumbai
Defunct newspapers published in India
English-language newspapers published in India
Marathi-language newspapers
1861 establishments in British India
Publications established in 1861
Literature of Indian independence movement
Indian independence movement in Maharashtra
Defunct weekly newspapers